, also known as  was the sixth legendary emperor of Japan, according to the traditional order of succession. Very little is known about this Emperor due to a lack of material available for further verification and study. Kōan is known as a "legendary emperor" among historians as his actual existence is disputed. Nothing exists in the Kojiki other than his name and genealogy. Kōan's reign allegedly began in 393 BC, he had one wife and two sons and reigned for more than 100 years until his death in 291 BC at the age of 137. One of his sons then supposedly became the next emperor. Emperor Kōan is traditionally accepted as the final emperor of the Jōmon period, which ended in 300 BC.

Legendary narrative 
In the Kojiki and Nihon Shoki, only his name and genealogy were recorded. The Japanese have traditionally accepted this sovereign's historical existence, and an Imperial misasagi or tomb for Kōan is currently maintained; however, no extant contemporary records have been discovered that confirm a view that this historical figure actually reigned. He is believed to be son of Emperor Kōshō; and his mother is believed to have been Yosotarashi-no-hime, who was the daughter of Okitsuyoso, and ancestress of the Owari. Kōan was allegedly an emperor who reigned for more than a hundred years, and lived to the age of 137 (according to the Kojiki). He allegedly had a wife named Yosotarashi-hime, and fathered two children with her. Kōan's reign lasted from 392 BC until his death in 291 BC, one of his sons then took the throne and would later be referred to as Emperor Kōrei.

Known information
The existence of at least the first nine Emperors is disputed due to insufficient material available for further verification and study. Kōan is thus regarded by historians as a "legendary Emperor", and is considered to have been the fifth of eight Emperors without specific legends associated with them. The name Kōan-tennō was assigned to him posthumously by later generations. His name might have been regularized centuries after the lifetime ascribed to Kōan, possibly during the time in which legends about the origins of the Yamato dynasty were compiled as the chronicles known today as the Kojiki. The name "Kōan" is first credited to Japanese scholar and writer Ōmi no Mifune, who allegedly came up with the name sometime in the latter half of the 8th century.

Emperor Kōan's longevity is disputed as the oldest verified humans usually go into the mid to late 110s. While historian John S. Brownlee calls Kōan's alleged age of 137 at the time of his death "too long", he also says that this isn't unusual for mythical figures. He ends his narrative by saying that nobody in Japan was bothered by the longevity of the former emperors until the modern era. Regardless of his age, the actual site of Kōan's grave is not known. Kōan is traditionally venerated at a memorial Shinto shrine (misasagi) in Tamade, Gose. The Imperial Household Agency designates this location as Kōan's mausoleum, and its formal name is Tamate no oka no e no misasagi.

The first emperor that historians state might have actually existed is Emperor Sujin, the 10th emperor of Japan. Outside of the Kojiki, the reign of Emperor Kinmei ( – 571 AD) is the first for which contemporary historiography is able to assign verifiable dates. The conventionally accepted names and dates of the early Emperors were not confirmed as "traditional" though, until the reign of Emperor Kanmu between 737 and 806 AD.

Consorts and children
Empress: , Prince Amatarashikunioshihito's daughter (Emperor Kōshō's son)
 
 , later Emperor Kōrei

See also
 Emperor of Japan
 List of Emperors of Japan
 Imperial cult

Notes

References

Further reading
 Aston, William George. (1896).  Nihongi: Chronicles of Japan from the Earliest Times to A.D. 697. London: Kegan Paul, Trench, Trubner.  
 Brown, Delmer M. and Ichirō Ishida, eds. (1979).  Gukanshō: The Future and the Past. Berkeley: University of California Press. ;  
 Chamberlain, Basil Hall. (1920). The Kojiki. Read before the Asiatic Society of Japan on April 12, May 10, and June 21, 1882; reprinted, May, 1919.  
 Nussbaum, Louis-Frédéric and Käthe Roth. (2005).  Japan encyclopedia. Cambridge: Harvard University Press. ;  
 Ponsonby-Fane, Richard Arthur Brabazon. (1959).  The Imperial House of Japan. Kyoto: Ponsonby Memorial Society. 
 Titsingh, Isaac. (1834). Nihon Ōdai Ichiran; ou,  Annales des empereurs du Japon.  Paris: Royal Asiatic Society, Oriental Translation Fund of Great Britain and Ireland.  
 Varley, H. Paul. (1980).  Jinnō Shōtōki: A Chronicle of Gods and Sovereigns. New York: Columbia University Press. ;  

 
 

Legendary Emperors of Japan
Longevity myths
People of Yayoi-period Japan